La Excelencia is an eleven piece salsa dura band from New York City founded by percussionists Julian Silva and Jose Vazquez-Cofresi. The band's music has a salsa romantica style, with themes incorporating immigration, poverty, and discrimination. Founded in 2005 by Luis Arona and Julian Silva, La Excelencia recorded and released three albums in the subsequent seven years. The group disbanded in 2012, with Vazquez-Confresi and some of the membership reforming as Orquesta SCC. The band reunited in 2017 under the direction of Silva to start working on their 4th album, "Machete."

Members

Current
Julian Silva - Owner/Producer/Composer/Arranger/Timbales (2005-2012, 2018–present)
Luis Arona - Bass (2005-2006, 2018–present)
Ronald Prokopez - Trombone (2005-2012, 2018–present)
Mike Engstrom - Trombone (2010-2012, 2018–present)
Willie Rodriguez - Piano  (2005-2012, 2018–present)
Jonathan Powell - Trumpet (2007-2012, 2018–present)
Gilberto Velazquez - Vocals (2008-2010, 2018–present)
Jonathan Gomez - Congas (2019)
Nestor Villar - Bongos/Cowbell (2011-2012, 2018–present)

Former
Jose Vazquez-Cofresi - Former co-owner/Composer/Congas (2005-2012)
Jack Davis - Trombone (2005-2008)
Charles Dilone - Bongos /Cowbell (2005-2012)
Sam Hoyt - Trumpet (2005-2008)
Rene Leslie - Vocals (2005-2006)
Hector Luis Pagan - Vocals (2005-2006)
Edwin Perez - Composer/Vocals (2005-2012)
Jorge Bringas - Bass (2007-2012)
Miki Hirose - Trumpet (2007-2012)
Tokunori Kajiwara – Arranger/Trombone (2007-2012)
Junior Beltran - Background Vocals (2010-2012)
Yuniel Jimenez - Tres/Background Vocals (2010-2012)

Discography
Salsa Con Conciencia (2006)
Mi Tumbao Social (2009)
Ecos Del Barrio (2012)
Machete (2020)

Single
Salsa Na'Ma (2019)

References

External links

Salsa music groups
Musical groups from New York City
American world music groups
Music of New York City
Salsa musicians
Latin jazz musicians
American jazz ensembles from New York City
Musical groups established in 2005
2005 establishments in New York City
Jazz musicians from New York (state)